St. Anthony's Senior Secondary school, New Delhi, India or  SAS is an unaided Christian institution owned by the Institute of the Franciscan Clarist Missionaries of the Most Blessed Sacrament, a body registered under the Societies Registration Act XXI 1860.

History
The school began on 5 January 1970 with merely 50 students on roll, and it has progressed extensively within a short span. It was affiliated to the C.B.S.E in 1974, Ever since, it has been securing positions and merits in the Board Examinations. At present the school has 2000(approx) students on roll.
It was founded by Rev. Mother Benigna Gastaldon, an Italian nun who worked in India from 1928 to 1994. It was opened as a branch of St. Anthony's Sr. Secondary School, Paharganj, of which she was the foundress. She was awarded ‘the Knight Commander of the Order of the Star of the Italian Solidarity’ by the Italian Government in 1974, for her service in India and ‘the Florentine Lily’ by the Florence Province of Italy for her outstanding humanitarian work and for her ideals of love and service for the emancipation of the girl child.

Student Council
The Student Council is an elected body which consists of a Pupil Leader, Assistant Pupil Leader, 6 House Captains, 6 Vice House Captains, 21 Senior Prefects and 15 Junior Prefects and 21 senior Discipline incharges and 15 junior Discipline incharges ( from each class) .The elections are held in the month of April. The Council for the Junior School is also elected on the same lines.

See also
Education in India
List of schools in India
List of schools in Delhi affiliated with CBSE

References

External links
 Central Board of Secondary Education

Catholic secondary schools in India
Franciscan high schools
High schools and secondary schools in Delhi
Christian schools in Delhi
1970 establishments in Delhi
Educational institutions established in 1970